The Mohol bushbaby (Galago moholi) is a species of primate in the family Galagidae which is native to mesic woodlands of the southern Afrotropics. It is physically very similar to the Senegal bushbaby, and was formerly considered to be its southern race. The two species differ markedly in their biology however, and no hybrids have been recorded in captivity.

Description
The nose-stripe is whitish and the ears are large and grey. The dorsal surface of the body has a greyish-brown pelage, and the underparts are white, sometimes with a yellowish tinge. The flanks, inside of the limbs, hands and feet are yellowish. The fingers and toes have spatulate tips. The tail is darker than the rest of the fur but is not very bushy.

Range
It is found in Angola, Botswana, Democratic Republic of the Congo, Malawi, Mozambique, Namibia, South Africa, Eswatini, Tanzania, Zambia and Zimbabwe. Perhaps also present in Rwanda and Burundi.

Habitat

Breeding populations of this species are to be found in the suburbs of Johannesburg and Pretoria. Some of these were originally escaped or released pets, while others have migrated from warmer regions.

Ecology
The Mohol bushbaby feeds predominantly on insects and gum. The gum is an exudate from Acacia trees that oozes out of punctures made by insects. The most favoured gum-trees are sweet thorn (Acacia karroo) and umbrella thorn (Acacia tortilis). In the winter, the bushbaby moves between gum trees across the ground, but in the wet summer season, it usually travels arboreally, and consumes a much higher percentage of invertebrates. Feeding takes place soon after sunset, and then again throughout the night sporadically.

Races
Several authors recognize two races:
 G. m. moholi – Moholi lesser bushbaby
Range: eastern part of range, westwards to western Zambia, where it intergrades with bradfieldi
 G. m. bradfieldi Roberts, 1931 – Namibia bushbaby
Range: Waterberg in Namibia northwards to southern Angola, and eastwards to northern Botswana including Makgadikgadi Pan, and the Western Province of Zambia

References

Mohol bushbaby
Mammals of Angola
Mammals of Botswana
Mammals of Burundi
Mammals of the Democratic Republic of the Congo
Mammals of Malawi
Mammals of Mozambique
Mammals of Namibia
Mammals of Rwanda
Mammals of South Africa
Mammals of Eswatini
Mammals of Tanzania
Mammals of Zambia
Mammals of Zimbabwe
Fauna of Southern Africa
Mohol bushbaby
Taxonomy articles created by Polbot
Taxa named by Andrew Smith (zoologist)